Bring It Home may refer to:

"Bring It Home", a song by Poison from their 1993 album Native Tongue
Bring It Home, a 1994 album by Savoy Brown
Bring It Home (Fateh album), 2016
"Bring It Home", a song by Feeder from their 2001 album Echo Park
"Bring It Home", a song by Swollen Members from their 2002 album Monsters in the Closet

See also
Bring It On Home (disambiguation), several songs
"Bring It On Home to Me", a 1961 song written and released by Sam Cooke
Bringing It All Back Home, a 1965 album by Bob Dylan